Aiperi Medet Kyzy (born 30 March 1999) is a Kyrgyzstani freestyle wrestler. She won one of the bronze medals in the women's 76 kg event at the 2021 World Wrestling Championships held in Oslo, Norway. She also represented Kyrgyzstan at the 2020 Summer Olympics in Tokyo, Japan.

At the 2018 Asian Games held in Jakarta, Indonesia, she won one of the bronze medals in the women's 76 kg event. She is also a two-time medalist, including gold, at the Islamic Solidarity Games and a three-time medalist, including gold, at the Asian Wrestling Championships.

Career 

She won the bronze medal in the 75 kg event at the 2017 Islamic Solidarity Games held in Baku, Azerbaijan. In August 2017, she competed in the 75 kg event at the World Wrestling Championships held in Paris, France. A month later, she won one of the bronze medals in the women's 75 kg event at the Asian Indoor and Martial Arts Games held in Ashgabat, Turkmenistan.

At the 2019 World U23 Wrestling Championship held in Budapest, Hungary, she won one of the bronze medals in the 76 kg event. In 2020, she won the silver medal in the 76 kg event at the Asian Wrestling Championships in New Delhi, India. In the final, she lost against Hiroe Minagawa of Japan. In the same year, she also won one of the bronze medals in the women's 76 kg event at the 2020 Individual Wrestling World Cup held in Belgrade, Serbia.

In April 2021, she qualified at the Asian Olympic Qualification Tournament held in Almaty, Kazakhstan to represent Kyrgyzstan at the 2020 Summer Olympics in Tokyo, Japan. In the same month, she secured the silver medal in her event at the 2021 Asian Wrestling Championships held in the same venue as the Asian Olympic Qualification Tournament. At the Olympics, she lost her bronze medal match against Yasemin Adar of Turkey in the women's 76 kg event.

At the 2021 U23 World Wrestling Championships held in Belgrade, Serbia, she won the gold medal in the 76 kg event. In 2022, she won the gold medal in the 76 kg event at the Yasar Dogu Tournament held in Istanbul, Turkey. She also won the gold medal in her event at the 2022 Asian Wrestling Championships held in Ulaanbaatar, Mongolia. Her gold medal streak continued at the 2021 Islamic Solidarity Games in Konya, Turkey with victory in the 76 kg event. She competed in the 76 kg event at the 2022 World Wrestling Championships held in Belgrade, Serbia.

She won the silver medal in the women's 76kg event at the 2023 Grand Prix Zagreb Open held in Zagreb, Croatia. She won one of the bronze medals in her event at the 2023 Ibrahim Moustafa Tournament held in Alexandria, Egypt.

Achievements

References

External links 

 

Living people
1999 births
Place of birth missing (living people)
Kyrgyzstani female sport wrestlers
Asian Games medalists in wrestling
Asian Games bronze medalists for Kyrgyzstan
Wrestlers at the 2018 Asian Games
Medalists at the 2018 Asian Games
Asian Wrestling Championships medalists
Islamic Solidarity Games medalists in wrestling
Islamic Solidarity Games competitors for Kyrgyzstan
Wrestlers at the 2020 Summer Olympics
Olympic wrestlers of Kyrgyzstan
World Wrestling Championships medalists
21st-century Kyrgyzstani women